Mieczysław Karol Gracz (3 August 1919 – 21 January 1991) was a Polish footballer who played as a forward for Wisła Kraków. He made 22 appearances for the Poland national team from 1947 to 1950.

References

External links
 

1919 births
1991 deaths
Footballers from Kraków
Polish footballers
Association football forwards
Poland international footballers
Wisła Kraków players
Polish football managers
Wisła Kraków managers
Zawisza Bydgoszcz managers